The Oman national football team is the national team of Oman that has represented Oman in international competitions since 1978. Although the team was officially founded in 1978, the squad was formed long before, and a proper football association was formed only in December 2005. The team is governed by the Oman Football Association.

1990s

1999

2000s

2000

2001

2002

2003

2004

2005

2006

2007

2008

2009

2010s

2010

2011

2012

2013

2014

2015

2016

2017

2018

2019

Notes

References 

1965
1990s in Omani sport
2000s in Omani sport
2010s in Omani sport
Results